The 1930 New Brunswick general election was held on 18 June 1930, to elect 48 members to the 37th New Brunswick Legislative Assembly, the governing house of the province of New Brunswick, Canada. Although political parties had no standing in law, thirty-one MLAs declared themselves to be Conservatives, and seventeen declared themselves to be Liberals.

References

1930 elections in Canada
Elections in New Brunswick
1930 in New Brunswick
June 1930 events